The Marske Monarch is a single-seat, high-wing, strut-braced, tailless ultralight glider and motor glider that was offered both as plans and a kit for amateur construction by Marske Aircraft.

Design and development
The Monarch first flew in 1974 and was designed to be both a powered self-launching sailplane and also a pure glider, depending on whether an engine was fitted. The glider version is suitable for car-tow or winch-launching.

The aircraft is built from fiberglass and epoxy laminates. The wing uses a D-cell leading edge. The optional engine can be mounted to the upright behind the pilot in pusher configuration, with the fuel tanks located in the leading edge D-cell. The original powerplant produced , but engines up to  can be fitted. When the lower-powered engine is installed the wing is relocated forward to maintain center of gravity. With the larger engine the wing is moved aft. The standard control stick is mounted from above, simplifying control runs to the high wing. The aircraft was proof tested to 9 g.

The Monarch has had several modifications designed for it, including mounting a conventional floor-mounted control stick. Other modifications include larger ailerons and rudder to improve the low-speed handling characteristics.

Variants
Monarch A

Monarch B

Monarch C

Monarch D
Longer span ailerons
Monarch E
Relocated spoilers and a larger rudder
Monarch G
Improved model

Specifications (Monarch C, D and E)

See also

References

External links

1970s United States sailplanes
Monarch
Aircraft first flown in 1974
Tailless aircraft
Motor gliders
Single-engined pusher aircraft
High-wing aircraft